This is a timeline of Serbian history, comprising important legal and territorial changes and political events in Serbia and its predecessor states. To read about the background to these events, see History of Serbia. See also the list of Serbian monarchs and list of presidents of Serbia.

7th century

8th century

9th century

10th century

11th century

12th century

13th century

14th century

15th century

16th century

17th century

18th century

19th century

20th century

21st century

See also
 Timeline of Belgrade

References

Further reading
 

Serbian
 
Years in Serbia